Your Eyes is an album by Kult,
originally released in September 1991 on Zig-Zac label. It was rereleased in October 1998 through S.P. Records.

Track listing
 all  tracks by Kult (music) and Kazik Staszewski (lyrics).
 "Czterej głupcy" – 2:56 (The Four Fools)
 "Tata w gestapo" – 3:07 (Dad in Gestapo)
 "Zgroza" – 2:45 (Horror)
 "Marność" – 2:26 (Vanity)
 "Barrum" – 2:59 
 "Medellin" – 3:16 
 "Chodź z nami" – 3:05  (Come With Us)
 "Parada wspomnień" – 4:11 (Memories on Parade)
 "6 lat później" – 6:11 (Six Years Later)
 "Yvette" – 4:36 
 "Strange" – 3:47 	
 "Generał Ferreira / Rząd oficjalny" – 4:59 (General Ferreira / The Official Government)
Bonus Tracks
 "Krew Boga" – 2:43 (The Blood of God)
 "Posłuchaj, to do Ciebie" – 2:24 (Listen, This Is to You)
 "Na całym świecie źle się dzieje koledzy" – 5:14 (Things Are Going Bad All Over the World, My Friends)
 "Hej, czy nie wiecie" – 5:20 (Hey, Don't You Know)

References

Kult (band) albums
1991 albums